David Emanuel Hoffman (born August 5, 1953) is an American writer and journalist, a contributing editor to The Washington Post. He won a Pulitzer Prize in 2010 for a book about the legacy of the nuclear arms race.

Journalism
Hoffman was born in Palo Alto, California and grew up in Delaware, where he attended the University of Delaware. He came to Washington D.C. in 1977 to work for the Capitol Hill News Service. As a member of the Washington bureau of the San Jose Mercury News, he covered Ronald Reagan's 1980 presidential campaign. In May 1982, he joined The Washington Post to help cover the Reagan White House. He also covered the first two years of the George H. W. Bush presidency. His White House coverage won three national journalism awards.

After reporting on the State Department, he became Jerusalem bureau chief for The Washington Post in 1992. After studying Russian at Oxford University, he began six years in Moscow. From 1995 to 2001, he served as Moscow bureau chief, and later as foreign editor and assistant managing editor for foreign news.

Hoffman's first book was published by PublicAffairs in 2002, The Oligarchs: Wealth and Power in the New Russia. He won the annual Pulitzer Prize for General Non-Fiction in 2010 for his second book, The Dead Hand: The Untold Story of the Cold War Arms Race and its Dangerous Legacy (Doubleday, 2009). The Prize citation termed it "a well documented narrative that examines the terrifying doomsday competition between two superpowers and how weapons of mass destruction still imperil humankind."
In 2015, Hoffman published The Billion Dollar Spy: A True Story of Cold War Espionage and Betrayal about the life of Adolf Tolkachev, who was arrested and executed for giving classified information to the CIA.

Bibliography
 The Oligarchs: Wealth and Power in the New Russia (PublicAffairs, 2002), 
 The Dead Hand: The Untold Story of the Cold War Arms Race and its Dangerous Legacy (Doubleday, 2009), 
 The Billion Dollar Spy: A True Story of Cold War Espionage and Betrayal, New York, Doubleday, 2015,  (about Adolf Tolkachev)

References

External links
 
 

American newspaper reporters and correspondents
Living people
Pulitzer Prize for General Non-Fiction winners
The Washington Post journalists
Writers from Palo Alto, California
American male journalists
21st-century American male writers
21st-century American journalists
21st-century American non-fiction writers
The Mercury News people
1953 births